Nephridiacanthus is a genus of parasitic worms belonging to the family Oligacanthorhynchidae.

The species of this genus are found in Africa.

Species:

Nephridiacanthus gerberi 
Nephridiacanthus kamerunensis 
Nephridiacanthus longissimus 
Nephridiacanthus major 
Nephridiacanthus manisensis 
Nephridiacanthus maroccanus 
Nephridiacanthus palawanensis 
Nephridiacanthus thapari

References

Archiacanthocephala
Acanthocephala genera